Ooni Larunnka was the 26th Ooni of Ife, a paramount traditional ruler of Ile Ife, the ancestral home of the Yorubas. He succeeded Ooni Lagunja and was succeeded by  
Ooni Ademilu.

References

Oonis of Ife
Yoruba history